Sanctions, economic or international, that have been imposed on Russia include:
 International sanctions during the Russo-Ukrainian War (2014–)
 Countering America's Adversaries Through Sanctions Act, US legislation (2017)
 International sanctions during the 2022 Russian invasion of Ukraine (2022)

For sanctions that Russia has imposed on other countries:
  (20th21st centuries)
  (2014–)
 Russia sanctions against Ukraine (2018–)